The Red Sea Afar Democratic Organisation (Afar af: Qasa Badih Qafarih Dimokraasih Missoyna; ; , transliteration: Al-tanzim Al-dimokrati Li-'afar Al-Bahr Al-Ahmar; abbreviated RSADO) is a political organisation and armed insurgent group based in Ethiopia. The organisation is made up of mainly ethnic Afar people, and was founded in early 1995-1996 following a revolt by the Red Sea Afar people led by Ahmed Humed, after the UN-supervised Eritrean independence referendum was held in 1993. The primary goal of RSADO is to achieve autonomy for the region known as Dankalia, inhabited mainly by the Red Sea Afar.

, RSADO is a member of the Eritrean Democratic Alliance (EDA) group of 11 Eritrean political organisations attempting to overthrow Eritrean president Isaias Afwerki's government.

History
Following the independence of Eritrea in May 1991, indigenous Afar started to face unprecedented persecution by the totalitarian one-party government of the People’s Front for Democracy and Justice led by Isaias Afwerki. The government of Eritrea began systematically removing the Red Sea Afar from their ancestral homeland, robbing them of their indigenous identity, denying them the rights to own and live off their traditional land and territories, destroying the basis of the Red Sea Afar economies such as fishing and animal husbandry, and confiscating Afar businesses.

The rule of Shabia was unreservedly welcomed by the Kebesa community while the bulk of Muslims were skeptically watching the situation and wishing that Shabia would rise up to the occasion and their fears would be proved wrong. They adopted a wait and see attitude giving the regime the benefit of doubt, but the regime did not attempt to take advantage of the opportunity and win back their trust or play down their fears and suspicions. The regime lost no time in exposing its partisan and partial nature totally ignoring their feelings. The regime went on harassing, imprisoning and purging citizens who dared to stand for their basic rights or even at a mere suspicion that they entertain such thoughts. This vindicated the worst fears that haunted the Muslims ever since Shabia's control of power.

This combined with dissatisfaction over the ruling PFDJ government led to a rebellion by the Red Sea Afar in Southern Eritrea in 1995, led by Ahmed Humad. The group used guerrilla war tactics and launched attacks in Eritrea. Though they posed great problems for the Eritrean government and army, it was also facing internal political conflicts in the very late 1990s.

References

External links
 Official website
 RSADO Facebook page

National liberation movements in Africa
Guerrilla organizations
1999 establishments in Ethiopia
Rebel groups in Ethiopia
Rebel groups in Eritrea